Kallmet is a former municipality in the Lezhë County, northwestern Albania. At the 2015 local government reform it became a subdivision of the municipality Lezhë. The population at the 2011 census was 4,118.

References

Former municipalities in Lezhë County
Administrative units of Lezhë